
Gmina Świnice Warckie is a rural gmina (administrative district) in Łęczyca County, Łódź Voivodeship, in central Poland.

Villages
Gmina Świnice Warckie contains the villages and settlements of Bielawy, Chęcin, Chorzepin, Chorzepinek, Chwalborzyce, Drozdów, Głogowiec, Grodzisko, Gusin, Hektary, Holendry, Kaznów, Kaznówek, Kosew, Kozanki Podleśne, Kraski, Ładawy, Łyków, Parski, Piaski, Podgórze, Podłęże, Polusin, Rogów, Rydzyna, Stawiszynek, Stemplew, Strachów, Świnice Warckie, Świnice Warckie-Kolonia, Tolów, Władysławów, Wola Świniecka, Wyganów, Zbylczyce and Zimne.

Neighbouring gminas
Gmina Świnice Warckie is bordered by the gminas of Dąbie, Grabów, Łęczyca, Uniejów and Wartkowice.

References
Polish official population figures 2006

Swinice Warckie
Łęczyca County